Chiu-Chu Melissa Liu (born December 15, 1974) is a Taiwanese mathematician who works as a professor of mathematics at Columbia University. Her research interests include algebraic geometry and symplectic geometry.

Education 
Liu graduated from National Taiwan University in 1996, and earned her Ph.D. in 2002 from Harvard University under the supervision of Shing-Tung Yau.

Career 
After continuing at Harvard as a Junior Fellow, she took a faculty position at Northwestern University, and moved to Columbia in 2006.

Liu won the Morningside Silver Medal in 2007. She was an invited speaker at the International Congress of Mathematicians in 2010.
In 2012, she became one of the inaugural fellows of the American Mathematical Society.

References

External links
Home page
女数学家刘秋菊： 愿把数学当做终生事业

1974 births
Living people
Columbia University faculty
Fellows of the American Mathematical Society
Harvard Fellows
Harvard University alumni
National Taiwan University alumni
Northwestern University faculty
21st-century Taiwanese mathematicians
Women mathematicians